An option screener is a tool that evaluates options based on criteria and generates a list of potential trading ideas. Most people who trade options are technical traders. It essentially means they look for patterns in charts. Also, they use statistical correlations and deviations and give them Greek names like alpha, beta, delta, theta, gamma, vega, and rho. 

Few professional money managers use technical analysis and these tools are typically used by individual traders. Its counterpart, fundamental analysis, similarly uses some math to generate ratios, but the inputs and outputs are much more tangible (e.g., income, revenue, assets).

Overview
Options, particularly exchange-traded options, are highly volatile securities whose market prices can change rapidly. In addition, the number of options in a market can be large. For instance, as of December 2013, there were over 550,000 individual equity option contracts, written on nearly 6,100 underlying stocks and exchange-traded funds (ETFs), listed on the various U.S. options exchanges. Each contract is typically listed on multiple exchanges, resulting in millions of separate option prices that all change in real-time.

Screening criteria
Being able to isolate option plays that appeal to a specific trader is a vital component of a useful option screener.  To do this, the option screener needs to allow the trader to define filters that narrow down the options based upon what the trader deems important.  Typical filters include, but are not limited to:

option expiration
historic volatility
implied volatility
moneyness
open interest
option price
p/e ratio
probability
put/call ratio
share price
stock exchange
strike price
intrinsic value
premium
volume

See also
 Stock selection criterion

References

Options (finance)
Derivatives (finance)